In mathematical logic, Tarski's high school algebra problem was a question posed by Alfred Tarski.  It asks whether there are identities involving addition, multiplication, and exponentiation over the positive integers that cannot be proved using eleven axioms about these operations that are taught in high-school-level mathematics.  The question was solved in 1980 by Alex Wilkie, who showed that such unprovable identities do exist.

Statement of the problem

Tarski considered the following eleven axioms about addition ('+'), multiplication ('·'), and exponentiation to be standard axioms taught in high school:
 x + y = y + x
 (x + y) + z = x + (y + z)
 x · 1 = x
 x · y = y · x
 (x · y) · z = x · (y · z)
 x · (y + z) = x · y + x ·z
 1x = 1
 x1 = x
 xy + z = xy · xz
 (x · y)z = xz · yz
 (xy)z = xy · z 

These eleven axioms, sometimes called the high school identities, are related to the axioms of a bicartesian closed category or an exponential ring. Tarski's problem then becomes: are there identities involving only addition, multiplication, and exponentiation, that are true for all positive integers, but that cannot be proved using only the axioms 1–11?

Example of a provable identity

Since the axioms seem to list all the basic facts about the operations in question, it is not immediately obvious that there should be anything provably true one can state using only the three operations, but cannot prove with the axioms.  However, proving seemingly innocuous statements can require long proofs using only the above eleven axioms.  Consider the following proof that 

Strictly we should not write sums of more than two terms without brackets, and therefore a completely formal proof would prove the identity  (or ) and would have an extra set of brackets in each line from  onwards.

The length of proofs is not an issue; proofs of similar identities to that above for things like  would take a lot of lines, but would really involve little more than the above proof.

History of the problem

The list of eleven axioms can be found explicitly written down in the works of Richard Dedekind, although they were obviously known and used by mathematicians long before then.  Dedekind was the first, though, who seemed to be asking if these axioms were somehow sufficient to tell us everything we could want to know about the integers.  The question was put on a firm footing as a problem in logic and model theory sometime in the 1960s by Alfred Tarski, and by the 1980s it had become known as Tarski's high school algebra problem.

Solution

In 1980 Alex Wilkie proved that not every identity in question can be proved using the axioms above. He did this by explicitly finding such an identity.  By introducing new function symbols corresponding to polynomials that map positive numbers to positive numbers he proved this identity, and showed that these functions together with the eleven axioms above were both sufficient and necessary to prove it.  The identity in question is

Intuitively, the identity cannot be proved because the high school axioms can't be used to discuss the polynomial   Reasoning about that polynomial and the subterm  requires a concept of negation or subtraction, and these are not present in the high school axioms.  Lacking this, it is then impossible to use the axioms to manipulate the polynomial and prove true properties about it.  Wilkie's results from his paper show, in more formal language, that the "only gap" in the high school axioms is the inability to manipulate polynomials with negative coefficients.

R. Gurevič showed in 1988 that there is no finite axiomatization for the valid equations for the positive natural numbers with 1, addition, multiplication, and exponentiation.

Generalisations

Wilkie proved that there are statements about the positive integers that cannot be proved using the eleven axioms above and showed what extra information is needed before such statements can be proved.  Using Nevanlinna theory it has also been proved that if one restricts the kinds of exponential one takes then the above eleven axioms are sufficient to prove every true statement.

Smaller such algebras have since been found, and it is now known that the smallest such one must have either 11 or 12 elements.

See also

Notes

References

 Stanley N. Burris, Karen A. Yeats, The saga of the high school identities, Algebra Universalis 52 no.2–3, (2004), pp. 325–342, .

Theorems in the foundations of mathematics
Universal algebra